Cottonwood Valley is a wide valley on the Colorado River on the border between Mohave County, Arizona and Clark County, Nevada.  It extends east  and west from the river into both states and is the first wide valley south of the Black Canyon of the Colorado, the last in a series of great canyons the Colorado River passes through after leaving the Rocky Mountains on its way west and where it makes its turn to the south toward the Gulf of California.

All of the Colorado River in Cottonwood Valley and the lower reach of the Black Canyon of the Colorado is now under Lake Mohave.

See also

List of valleys of the Lower Colorado River Valley

References

Lake Mead National Recreation Area
Landforms of Mohave County, Arizona
Landforms of Clark County, Nevada
Colorado River
Valleys of the Lower Colorado River Valley